Australia's climate is governed mostly by its size and by the hot, sinking air of the subtropical high pressure belt (subtropical ridge or Australian High). This moves north-west and north-east with the seasons. The climate is variable, with frequent droughts lasting several seasons, thought to be caused in part by the El Niño-Southern Oscillation. Australia has a wide variety of climates due to its large geographical size. The largest part of Australia is desert or semi-arid. Only the south-east and south-west corners have a temperate climate and moderately fertile soil. The northern part of the country has a tropical climate, varying between grasslands and desert. Australia holds many heat-related records: the continent has the hottest extended region year-round, the areas with the hottest summer climate, and the highest sunshine duration.

Because Australia is a medium-sized continent, separated from polar regions by the Southern Ocean, it is not subject to movements of frigid polar air during winter, of the type that sweep over the continents in the northern hemisphere during their winter. Consequently, Australia's winter is relatively mild, with less contrast between summer and winter temperatures than in the northern continents–though the transition is more dramatically marked in alpine regions of Australia and places of substantial elevation. Seasonal highs and lows can still be considerable. Minimum temperatures are moderated.

The El Niño–Southern Oscillation is associated with seasonal abnormality in many areas in the world. Australia is one of the continents most affected and experiences extensive droughts alongside considerable wet periods. Occasionally a dust storm will blanket a region and there are reports of the occasional tornado. Tropical cyclones, heat waves, bushfires and frosts in the country are also associated with the Southern Oscillation. Rising levels of salinity and desertification in some areas is ravaging the landscape.

Climate change in Australia is a highly contentious political issue. Temperatures in the country rose by approximately 0.7 °C between 1910 and 2004, following an increasing trend of global warming. Overnight minimum temperatures have warmed more rapidly than daytime maximum temperatures in recent years. The late-20th century warming has been largely attributed to the increased greenhouse effect.

States and territories

Australian Capital Territory

Canberra has warm to hot, dry summers with some thunderstorms. Heavy frosts are commonplace and radiation fog often occurs. Many of the higher mountains to the territory's west are snow-covered for a large part of the winter and early spring. The region is dry throughout its entirety due to its position on the leeward side of the Brindabella Ranges.

New South Wales

Over half of New South Wales has an arid or semi-arid climate. The eastern portion has a temperate climate, ranging from humid subtropical from its northern border to the Central Coast and most of Sydney, and oceanic to the south coast. The Snowy Mountains region in the south-east falls in the alpine climate or subpolar oceanic climate zone, with cool to cold weather all year around and regular heavy snowfalls in the winter and spring. Further inland, the climate is semi-arid and a desert climate towards the western part of the state.

The weather in the southern half of the state is generally warm to hot in summer and cool in the winter. The seasons are more defined in the southern half of the state, especially in the South West Slopes, Central West and the Riverina regions. On the coast and anywhere east of the dividing range, a summer rainfall peak is observed throughout its entire latitudinal span. On the ranges and farther inland, rainfall usually peaks in spring in most of parts of the state, though the South West Slopes region, in the south-central part of the state (bordering Victoria), has a distinct winter rainfall peak; whereas the New England and North West Slopes regions have a summer rainfall peak. On a hot summer day, a southerly buster may at times moderate the extreme heat experienced in the coastal New South Wales region, from Port Macquarie southwards to Nowra.

The warmest region by annual maxima is the north-west, where summers are extremely hot, but winters relatively cooler and dry. The weather in the northeast region of the state, or the North Coast, bordering Queensland, is moderately hot, humid and rainy in the summer, and mild in winter with more sunshine; and little seasonal temperature difference. The Northern Tablelands have relatively milder summers and colder winters, due to their high elevation and inland location on the Great Dividing Range. The southeast coastal plain, which lies on the leeward side of the Great Dividing Range, experiences foehn winds, particularly between winter and spring, which can elevate fire danger.

The coldest region is the Snowy Mountains where the snow and ice continues for a long period during the winter months. The Blue Mountains, Southern Tablelands and Central Tablelands, which are situated on the Great Dividing Range, have mild to warm summers and cold winters, although not as severe as those in the Snowy Mountains. The areas situated in the valleys of the range, such as Bathurst, Goulburn and Bowral, among other places, have recorded freezing and/or near-freezing lows in most months of the year, unlike other places of similar latitude and altitude in the northern hemisphere.

This is also the lowest temperature recorded in the whole of Australia excluding Australian Antarctic Territory.

Rainfall varies throughout the state.

Northern Territory 

The Northern Territory has two distinctive climate zones. The northern end, including Darwin, has a tropical savannah climate (Köppen Aw) with high humidity and two seasons, the wet (October to April) and dry season (May to September). During the dry season nearly every day is warm and sunny, and afternoon humidity averages around 30%. There is very little rainfall between May and September.

The wet season is associated with tropical cyclones and monsoon rains. The majority of rainfall occurs between December and March (the Southern Hemisphere summer), when thunderstorms are common and afternoon relative humidity averages over 70% during the wettest months. Thunderstorms can produce spectacular lightning displays.

The rest of the territory lies in the desert centre of the country; it includes Alice Springs and Uluru, and is arid or semi-arid with little rain usually falling during the hottest months from October to March.

Queensland

Because of its size, there is significant variation in climate across the state. Low rainfall and hot summers are typical for the inland west, a monsoonal 'wet' season in the far north, and warm subtropical conditions along the coastal strip. Inland and in southern ranges cooler temperatures are experienced, especially at nights. The climate of the coastal strip is influenced by warm ocean waters, keeping the region free from extremes of temperature and providing moisture for rainfall.

There are five predominant climatic zones in Queensland, based on temperature and humidity:
 hot humid summer (far north and coastal)
 warm humid summer (coastal elevated hinterlands and coastal south-east)
 hot dry summer, mild winter (central west)
 hot dry summer, cold winter (southern west)
 temperate – warm summer, cold winter (inland south-east, e.g. Granite Belt)

However, most of the Queensland populace experience two weather seasons: a winter period of rather warm temperatures with minimal rainfall, and a sultry summer period of hot, sticky temperatures and more rain.

South Australia

The majority of the state has the arid and semi-arid climates. The southern coastal parts of the state have a Mediterranean climate with mild wet winters and hot dry summers. Most of the rain in the southern districts of the State fall during the winter months when the sub-tropical high-pressure belt is displaced to the north over the Australian continent.

Tasmania

Tasmania has a cool temperate climate, with most areas under an oceanic climate (Cfb), with four distinct seasons. Autumn lasts between March and May and experiences changeable weather, where summer weather patterns gradually take on the shape of winter patterns.

Victoria

Victoria has a varied climate despite its small size. It ranges from semi-arid and hot in the north-west, to temperate and cool along the coast. Victoria's main land feature, the Great Dividing Range, produces a cooler, mountain climate in the centre and east of the state.

The coastal plain south of the Great Dividing Range has Victoria's mildest climate. Regular frontal systems off the Southern Ocean significantly mitigate the heat of summer. Melbourne and other large cities are located in this temperate region.

The Mallee and upper Wimmera are Victoria's warmest regions with hot winds blowing from nearby deserts.

The Victorian Alps in the eastern and central regions constitute the coldest climate of Victoria. The Alps are part of the Great Dividing Range extending east–west through the centre of Victoria.

Victoria is the wettest Australian state after Tasmania. Rainfall in Victoria increases from north to south, with higher averages in areas of high altitude.

Rain is heaviest in the Otway Ranges on the southwest coast and West Gippsland in South-Central Victoria, and in the mountainous Northeast. Snow often falls on the low-lying hilly country in the centre of the state, and on rare occasions may also fall to sea level. Rain falls most frequently in winter, but summer precipitation is heavier. Rainfall is most reliable in Gippsland and the Western District, making them both leading farming areas.

Western Australia

Most of Western Australia has a hot arid and semi-arid climate. However, the south-west corner of the state has a Mediterranean climate. The area was originally heavily forested, including large stands of the karri, one of the world's tallest trees. This agricultural region of Western Australia is in the top nine terrestrial habitats for terrestrial biodiversity, with a higher proportion of endemic species than most other equivalent regions. Due to the offshore Leeuwin Current, the area numbers in the top six regions for marine biodiversity, containing the most southerly coral reefs in the world.

Plants must be adapted to this as well as the extreme poverty of all soils. A major reduction in rainfall has been observed, with a greater number of rainfall events in the summer months. The central four-fifths of the state is semi-arid or desert and is lightly inhabited with the only significant activity being mining.

An exception to this is the northern tropical regions. Eighty-five per cent of the state's runoff occurs in the Kimberley, but because it occurs in violent floods and because of the insurmountable poverty of the generally shallow soils, development has only taken place along the Ord River.

Australia's tropical/subtropical location and cold waters off the western coast make most of Western Australia a hot desert with aridity a marked feature of a greater part of the continent. These cold waters produce precious little moisture needed on the mainland. A 2005 study by Australian and American researchers investigated the desertification of the interior, and suggested that one explanation was related to human settlers who arrived about 50,000 years ago.

Snowfall in the state is rare, and typically only in the Stirling Range near Albany, the southwesternmost point in WA, the only mountain range far enough south and with sufficient elevation. More rarely, snow can fall on the nearby Porongurup Range. Snow outside these areas is a major event; it usually occurs in hilly areas of south-western Australia. The most widespread low-level snow occurred on 26 June 1956 when snow was reported in the Perth Hills, as far north as Wongan Hills and as far east as Salmon Gums. However, even in the Stirling Range, snowfalls rarely exceed  and rarely settle for more than one day.

Distant Australian islands

Precipitation

Rain

A place inland near Lake Eyre (in South Australia) would only receive  of rain annually. Another place, Troudaninna Bore (altitude : 46 m) in South Australia, from 1893 to 1936, received, in average, 104.9 mm (4.13 inches) of precipitation. Four factors contribute to the dryness of the Australian landmass:

Cold ocean currents off the west coast
Low elevation of landforms
Dominance of high-pressure systems
Shape of the landmass

Thunderstorms are relatively common in the region, with an annual average of 15 to 20 thunderstorms.

The southern parts of Australia get the usual westerly winds and rain-bearing cold fronts that come when high–pressure systems move towards northern Australia during winter. Cold snaps may bring frosts inland, though temperatures near the coast are mild or near mild all year round. The Australian northwest cloudbands provides up to 80% of the annual rainfall for northwestern Australia and up to 40% of the annual rainfall for southwestern Australia, including most of the winter rainfall over northwest Western Australia and Central Australia.  Summers in southern Australia are generally dry and hot with coastal sea breezes. During a lengthy dry spell, hot and dry winds from the interior can cause bushfires in some southern and eastern states, though most commonly Victoria and New South Wales.

The tropical areas of northern Australia have a wet summer because of the monsoon. During "the wet", typically October to April, humid north-westerly winds bring showers and thunderstorms. Occasionally, tropical cyclones can bring heavy rainfall to tropical coastal regions, which is also likely to reach further inland. After the monsoonal season, the dry season comes ("winter"), which brings mostly clear skies and milder conditions.

Rainfall records tend to be concentrated along the east coast of Australia, particularly in tropical north Queensland. The highest monthly rainfall on record was  recorded at Mount Bellenden Ker, Queensland in January 1979. The highest annual rainfall was  recorded also at Mount Bellenden Ker in 2000.

Cold ocean currents off the coast of Western Australia result in little evaporation occurring. Hence, rain clouds are sparsely formed and rarely do they form long enough for a continuous period of rain to be recorded. Australia's arid/semi-arid zone extends to this region. The absence of any significant mountain range or area of substantial height above sea level, results in very little rainfall caused by orographic uplift. In the east the Great Dividing Range limits rain moving into inland Australia.

Australia has a compact shape, and no significant bodies of water penetrate very far inland. This is important in as much as moist winds are prevented from penetrating inland, so keeping rainfall low.

Snow

In Australia, snow falls frequently on the highlands near the east coast, in the states of Victoria, New South Wales and Tasmania and in the Australian Capital Territory. There is a regular snow season in several areas which have seasonal ski tourism industries, such as Thredbo, Cabramurra, Mount Buller and Perisher Ski Resort, among others. Snow falls with some regularity below  on the Great Dividing Range, seldom as far north as Stanthorpe in southernmost Queensland and in isolated parts of South Australia and Western Australia, but outside these areas, snow is an extremely rare occurrence. Snow has also fallen on Uluru and near Alice Springs on at least one occasion.

Snow at sea level is occasionally recorded on mainland Australia (namely in southwestern and south-central Victoria), but is more frequent in Tasmania where snowfalls at sea level can occur nigh to annually during the winter months; and in the extreme event of November 2021, snow was recorded to sea level on Bruny Island. Snow has been recorded across most of Tasmania, though it is rare on the northern coast at sea level. Snow is rare in the southernmost capitals like Melbourne and Hobart, falling less than once every five years, and in the other capitals it is unknown (however snow has fallen in the hill suburbs of Perth and Adelaide). There are extensive, well-developed ski fields in the Great Dividing Range, a few hours' drive from Melbourne and Sydney. Light snow generally falls every winter in Canberra, and other cities that receive more regular seasonal snowfalls include Orange, Oberon, Lithgow and Katoomba in New South Wales. West of the Great Dividing Range, particularly in the South West Slopes, snow is observed more frequently and to much lower altitudes than on the eastern side (even Parkes and Forbes have recorded snow).

The occasional cold snap, caused by cold air drifting north from Antarctica, can cause significant snowfall in rural areas, as well as major cities such as Hobart, Melbourne's outer mountain suburbs and Canberra. Such occasions are rare, but have occurred in 1958, 1965, 1986, 2005 and 2015, the 1965 event causing snow to fall as far north as Eungella, near Mackay in tropical Queensland. Extreme snow events have also produced snow as far north-west as Longreach in Queensland and in the ranges near Alice Springs, and also in lowland towns such as Dubbo and Wagga Wagga in New South Wales. The frequency and intensity of such events have been decreasing significantly over the past 40 years and the most northerly occurrence of snow in this time frame has been the Bunya Mountains in southern Queensland.

Temperatures

The tropical savannah zone of Northern Australia is warm to hot all year. Summers are hot in most of the country with average January maximum temperatures exceeding 30 °C over most of the mainland, except for high elevations. Winters are warm in the north and cool in the south, with nightly frosts common in inland areas south of the Tropic of Capricorn. Only at the highly elevated areas do wintertime temperatures approach those found in much of Europe or North America, especially the southern parts.

Temperatures in Australia have followed an increasing trend between the years of 1910 to 2004 by approximately 0.7 °C. Overnight minimum temperatures have warmed more rapidly than daytime maximum temperatures. The observed warming has hastened in recent years. The late-20th-century warming has been largely attributed to the increased greenhouse effect. Temperature differences between winter and summer are minor in the tropical region of Australia. However, they are greatest in the southern inland, with seasonal differences along the coast being moderated by the ocean's proximity. In July, a more common latitudinal distribution of average maximums is apparent, ranging from 30 °C near the north coast to below 3 °C in the mountainous areas of the south-east.

Average minimum temperatures in all seasons are highest in northern Australia and near the coastal areas, and are lowest in the elevated areas of the south-east. The highest average January minimum temperatures (near 27 °C) are found near the north-west coast, while in winter they exceed 20 °C at some coastal locations in northern Australia and on the Torres Strait and Tiwi Islands. In the mountains of New South Wales, it is not unusual to have average low minimum temperatures dipping below 5 °C in January and −5 °C in July. Comparatively, most inland (non-mountainous) areas south of the tropics have average July minimum between 0 and 6 °C.

In the desert, the dry air and clear skies give rather large ranges in temperature between day and night. Ranges of 15 °C being typical and 20 °C not quite unusual. Light nighttime frosts in winter occur over much of the southern half of the arid zone, where mean July minimum temperatures are mostly in the 3 to 6 °C range. Moving north, frosts become increasingly rare, with mean July minimum being around 10 °C on the northern boundary.

The highest maximums in Australia are recorded in two regions, the Pilbara and Gascoyne regions of north-western Western Australia and the area extending from south-western Queensland across South Australia into south-eastern Western Australia. Many locations in this region have recorded temperatures exceeding 48 °C. In January, average maximum temperatures exceed 35 °C over a large area of the interior and exceed 40 °C over areas in the north-west. The highest summer maximums in the Pilbara and Gascoyne average at around 41 °C (in some years daily maximums consecutively exceed 40 °C for several weeks at a time).

Extremes

The most powerful heatwave in the history of south-eastern Australia occurred in January 1939. Adelaide (46.1 °C on the 12th), Melbourne (45.6 °C on the 13th) and Sydney (45.3 °C on the 14th) all had record-high temperatures during this period, as did many other central district areas in New South Wales, Victoria and South Australia. The record number of consecutive days in Melbourne over 40 °C is five, with Brisbane and Sydney each having two. Heatwaves usually bring by oppressively warm nights, with Oodnadatta, SA recording an Australian record of nine nights above 30 °C in February 2004. Another extreme event was a prolonged period of extensive heatwaves known as the Angry Summer in early 2013.

Marble Bar achieved 160 consecutive days above  in 1923–24. Nyang had an average maximum of 44.8 °C for the months of February 1998 and January 2005, an Australian record. At the other extreme, average January maximums are near 15 °C on the highest peaks of the south-east ranges and near 20 °C in much of Tasmania. In most of the desert region during summer, cool days are rare and usually associated with major rain events—a rather exceptional example occurred in February 1949, when many areas failed to reach 20 °C on one or more days, and the maximum at Boulia, western Queensland was at 14.4 °C, which was 23 °C below normal.

Many other locations in Australia, except those above 500 metres, have extreme maximums between 43 and 48 °C. Most Tasmanian sites away from the north coast have had extreme maximums between 35 and 40 °C. The lowest extreme maximums are found along the north coast of Tasmania (e.g. 29.5 °C at Low Head) and at high elevations (27.0 °C at Thredbo). While extreme high temperatures are more common inland than they are near the coast, notable extreme maxima have been observed near the coast; 50.7 °C at Onslow, 50.5 °C at Mardie, 49.9 °C at Nullarbor, South Australia, 49.8 °C at Eucla, South Australia and 49.5 °C at Port Augusta, South Australia.

At lower elevations, most inland places south of the tropics have extreme minimum between −3 and −7 °C, and these low temperatures have also occurred in locations within a few kilometres of southern and eastern coasts, such as Sale, Victoria (−5.6 °C), Bega, New South Wales (−8.1 °C), Grove, Tasmania (−7.5 °C) and Taree, New South Wales (−5.0 °C). Many locations in this region have recorded −10 °C or lower, including Gudgenby in the Australian Capital Territory (−14.6 °C) and Woolbrook, New South Wales (−14.5 °C). In the desert, the lowest extreme minimum occur at high elevations, especially around Alice Springs, where the temperature has fallen as low as −7.5 °C.

In the tropics, extreme minimum near or below 0 °C have occurred at many places distant from the coast, as far north as Herberton, Queensland (−5.0 °C).

A list of extremes can be found in the tables below:

Natural hazards and disasters

Bushfires

Climatic factors contribute to Australia's high incidence of bushfires, particularly during the summer months. Low relative humidity, wind and lack of rain can cause a small fire, either man-made or caused by lightning strikes, to spread rapidly. Low humidity, the heat of the sun and lack of water cause vegetation to dry out becoming a perfect fuel for the fire. High winds fan the flames, increasing their intensity and the speed and distance at which they can travel.

Many of the worst bushfires in eastern Australia, such as the 1983 Ash Wednesday fires, accompany El Niño–Southern Oscillation events which tend to cause a warm, dry and windy climate.

The worst bushfires in Australian history occurred during the 2019–2020 Australian bushfire season, also known as the "Black Summer", which lasted for 6 months and burnt 140,000 km² (55,000 mi²) of land primarily in New South Wales, Victoria, Queensland and the Australian Capital Territory. By the end of the season there had been 14-34 direct human deaths, hundreds of indirect human deaths, 1-3 billion animal deaths and 3,500 homes destroyed.

Prior to this, the worst had been the Black Saturday fires in February to March 2009, causing 173 deaths and destroying over 2000 homes in Victoria.

Flooding

Though most of Australia is arid or semi-arid, some regions have very significant rainfall. The Wet Tropics in northeast Queensland as well as the western half of Tasmania both average over 1400mm (55in) of rainfall annually, sometimes much higher. As a result the former has some of Australia's only tropical rainforest, while the latter features extensive temperate rainforests where floods can occur at any time.

Through La Niña years the eastern seaboard of Australia (east of the Great Dividing Range) records above-average rainfall, usually creating damaging floods. The 2010–2011 La Niña system broke many rainfall records in Australia, particularly in the states of Queensland and New South Wales, with extensive flooding and major damage to infrastructure and crops. The central east area of Queensland, an area the size of Germany and France combined, was under water in 2010–11. La Nina related flooding has affected major eastern cities such as Sydney, and especially Brisbane. The 2022 eastern Australia floods were also one of the worst recorded flood events.

West of the Great Dividing Range, higher than average rainfall may be related to a negative Indian Ocean Dipole, which sometimes leads to inland flooding, particularly in the Murray-Darling Basin river system and its flood plains and especially during winter.

The Top End, Kimberley and much of North and Far North Queensland are affected by the Australian monsoon (wet season) which brings heavy rain, thunderstorms, tropical cyclones (see below) and frequent flooding from November to April, making many unsealed roads impassable for part of the year. As a result these regions are feature extensive tropical savannah.

Drought

Drought in Australia is defined by rainfall over a three-month period being in the lowest ten per cent of amounts having been recorded for that region in the past. This definition takes into account that low rainfall is a relative term and rainfall deficiencies need to be compared to typical rainfall patterns including seasonal variations. Specifically drought in Australia is defined in relation to a rainfall deficiency of pastoral leases and is determined by decile analysis applied to a certain area.

Historical climatic records are now sufficiently reliable to profile climate variability taking into account expectations for regions. State Governments are responsible for declaring a region drought affected and the declaration will take into account factors other than rainfall.

Tropical cyclones

Australia is affected by tropical cyclones which primarily occur between December and April but have occasionally developed in November and May. Cyclones over mainland Australia occur on average five to six times each year. The regions between Broome and Exmouth are most prone to cyclones. Tropical cyclones are known to bring destructive winds, heavy rain with flooding creating storm surges along the coast, causing inundation to low-lying areas. The strongest Australian region cyclone was 2006's Cyclone Monica, with gusts topping . Cyclones can also move inland, decaying to rain depressions, dumping heavy rain and causing flooding.

The worst cyclones of Australia have caused billions of dollars of damage and many deaths. Cyclone Tracy crossed directly over Darwin in 1974, killing 71 persons. It was Australia's most damaging cyclone. Cyclone Larry struck North Queensland and passed over Innisfail in 2006 causing damages estimated at A$1.5 billion. However, there were no deaths in that storm. Cyclone Yasi caused severe flooding and had a total estimated cost of A$3.5 billion making it the second-most costliest cyclone to strike Australia.

Blizzards
Blizzards are not common in mainland Australia, but occur frequently in the Snowy Mountains in New South Wales and Victoria. When blizzards do occur, they can affect the Tasmanian Highlands and, particularly, Mount Wellington, which towers over the Tasmanian capital Hobart. Blizzards do not affect any major towns or cities, because there are no populated areas located in the mountains except for the ski resort towns of New South Wales and Victoria.

Dust storms

A dust storm or sandstorm, a meteorological phenomenon common in arid and semi-arid regions, arises when a gust front passes or when the wind force exceeds the threshold value where loose sand and dust are removed from the dry surface. Particles are transported by saltation and suspension, causing soil erosion from one place and deposition in another.

Sandstorm usually refers to dust storms in desert areas when, in addition to fine particles obscuring visibility, a considerable amount of larger sand particles moves closer to the surface. The term dust storm is more likely to be used when finer particles are blown long distances, especially when the dust storm affects urban areas.

Climate change

See also

 Indigenous Australian seasons
 List of wettest known tropical cyclones in Australia
 Weather extremes in Australia, an index of extreme Australian weather articles
 Effects of the El Niño–Southern Oscillation in Australia

References

External links

Australian Bureau of Meteorology – Climate Information
Interactive: 100 years of temperatures in Australia – ABC News (Australian Broadcasting Corporation)
Interactive: 100 years of rainfall in Australia

 
Australia
Articles containing video clips